Tokoldosh is a housing estate in Bishkek, the capital of Kyrgyzstan. It is part of the Oktyabr District.

References

Bishkek